Confederation of Zimbabwe Industries (CZI) is the primary organisation for industry in Zimbabwe, founded in 1923.  CZI has four regional chamber offices in Mashonaland, Matebeleland, Midlands, and Manicaland and the head office is in Harare. It is an independent, self-financed, legally constituted organisation.

References

External links
 http://www.czi.co.zw/

Economy of Zimbabwe
Business organizations based in Africa
Organizations established in 1923
1923 establishments in Africa